Katalalixar National Reserve is a natural reserve located in an archipelago between Southern Patagonian Ice Field, and Northern Patagonian Ice Field in Aysén del General Carlos Ibáñez del Campo Region of Chile. The reserve was created in 1983 and has no infrastructure. It covers an area of  within the Magellanic subpolar forests ecoregion and exhibits more biodiversity than other areas of southern Chile.  This may appear contradictory, as the area is supposed to have been covered by the Patagonian Ice Sheet during the last glacial maximum.

References

National reserves of Chile
Protected areas of Aysén Region
Protected areas established in 1983
Magellanic subpolar forests